Vanja Mičeta  (15 April 1969) is a synchronized swimmer from Serbia. 

Vanja competed as an Independent Olympic Participant at the 1992 Summer Olympics in the women's duet.

References 

1969 births
Living people
Serbian synchronized swimmers
Olympic synchronized swimmers as Independent Olympic Participants
Synchronized swimmers at the 1992 Summer Olympics